Roman Šimunek (born 2 January 1982) is a Slovak professional ice hockey player.

He played with HC Slovan Bratislava in the Slovak Extraliga.

References

1982 births
Living people
HC Slovan Bratislava players
Slovak ice hockey forwards
Place of birth missing (living people)
SHK Hodonín players
KTH Krynica players
HC Kometa Brno players
Slovak expatriate ice hockey players in the Czech Republic
Slovak expatriate sportspeople in Poland
Slovak expatriate sportspeople in Italy
Expatriate ice hockey players in Italy
Expatriate ice hockey players in Poland